"(Every Time I Turn Around) Back in Love Again" is a hit song written by Len Ron Hanks and Zane Grey for R&B/funk band L.T.D. Released from their Something To Love album, it spent two weeks at number one on the R&B singles chart in the fall of 1977.  It became a gold record. 
Jeffrey Osborne is the lead singer.

"Back in Love Again" was their biggest pop hit, peaking at number 4 on the Billboard Hot 100 singles chart.  The single also reached number 19 on the disco charts.  The song was also a major hit on the Canadian pop charts, where it spent two weeks at number two.

Personnel 
Jeffrey Osborne - Lead Vocals, Backing Vocals, Percussion
Billy Osborne - Organ, Percussion, Backing Vocals
Jimmie Davis - Clavinet, Electric Piano, Piano, Backing Vocals
Henry Davis - Bass, Backing Vocals
Bernorce Blackman, John McGhee - Guitar
Carle Vickers - Flute, Flugelhorn, Soprano Saxophone, Trumpet
Abraham "Onion" Miller - Tenor Saxophone, Backing Vocals
Lorenzo Carnegie - Alto Saxophone, Tenor Saxophone
Jake Riley - Trombone
Melvin Webb - Drums
Lorraine Johnson - Backing Vocals

Chart history

Weekly charts

Year-end charts

References

1977 singles
1977 songs
L.T.D. (band) songs
Jeffrey Osborne songs
A&M Records singles